Platense Football Club S.A. de C.V. or simply Platense is a Honduran football club, located in Platense, Puerto Cortés, Cortés.

The club was founded on 4 July 1960 and in 1965 became the first champions of the Honduran National Football League. Their home venue is the Estadio Excelsior.

History
Officially Platense Sport Club was founded on July 4, 1960, in the neighborhood of Campo Rojo, Puerto Cortés. The initial founders were Roger Riera, Roberto Mejía, Roosevelt Garbut, and Rene Paiz.  They were later joined by Manuel Flores, Héctor Sánchez, Rolando Méndez, Samuel Williams, Rudolph Williams, Ricardo Fúnez, Julio Linares, Óscar Pineda, Raúl Betancourt, Francisco Maldonado, Humberto Dole, Rolando Zavala and Reginaldo Guevara.

The founders looked to emulate a successful international club, and ultimately settled on Platense, inspired by Platense of Argentina.  In its early years, the club was supported by the Tela Railroad Company. When amateurism was still in effect, Tela provided jobs and a salary for club athletes, and helped Platense establish itself on a solid financial footing.

After the Honduran National Soccer League was founded in 1964; Club Deportivo Platense became one of its 10 original members.  They would also become its first champions, winning the league 27–26 over Olimpia.

The key players on that team were: Gilberto Zavala, Tomas Maximo, Ricardo 'Cañon' Fúnez, Felix 'Mantequilla' Guerra, Raúl Betancourt, Santos 'Kubala' Díaz, Miguel 'El Chino' Hernandez, 'Pichingo' Croasdaile, Francisco Brocatto, Carlos "Care" Alvarado, "Chita" Arzú, León Victor "Escalera" Jallú, among others.

Having won the very first title, however, Platense had to wait another thirty-six years for its second.  They were close twice, finishing runners-up in 1996–97 and Apertura 2000.  However, it wasn't until Clausura 2001 that Platense returned to glory.

Their opponents, Olimpia, were the most dominant and successful team in Honduras.  The first leg of the tie was in Puerto Cortés and finished with a victory for the 'Tiburón' by the score of 1–0. The Argentine Marcelo Verón scored the winning goal. The return game was won by Club Olimpia by the same score. This forced the teams to go to over-time.  The champion would be the team that scored the first goal (Golden goal). It was Platense's Rony Morales who proved the hero, scoring the goal that gave Platense its first title in a generation.

Platense reached two more semi-finals, but their form soon declined.  In June 2012, they were relegated and were only able to stay in the top flight by virtue of a merger with CD Necaxa.

Achievements
Liga Nacional
Winners (2): 1965–66, 2000–01 C
Runners-up (4): 1996–97, 2000–01 A, 2002–03 A, 2016–17 A

Honduran Cup
Winners (3): 1996, 1997, 2018
Runners-up (1): 2015

Honduran Supercup
Runners-up (2): 1997, 1999

Segunda División
Winners (1): 1982

Amateur League
Runners-up (1): 1964

Cortés Championship
Winners (2): 1962, 1964

League and Playoffs Performance
(1994–present)

All-Time Table
(From 1965 to 1966 to 2007–08)

36 Game Average

International competition

CONCACAF Champions' Cup
1975 CONCACAF Champions' Cup
First Round v.  Aurora – 4:3, 0:1 (Aurora advance on away goals rule)

1998 CONCACAF Champions' Cup
First Round v.  Aurora – 2:1
First Round v.  Aurora – 2:1
First Round v.  Real Verdes – 0:0
First Round v.  Real Verdes – 6:0
First Round v.  Luis Ángel Firpo – 0:1
Second Round v.  Saprissa – 1:3
Second Round v.  Comunicaciones – 3:1
Second Round v.  Saprissa – 0:0
Second Round v.  Comunicaciones – 1:2

CONCACAF Cup Winners Cup
1997 CONCACAF Cup Winners Cup
First Round v.  Juventus – 0:1, 4:1 (Platense advance 4:2 on aggregate)
Second Round v.  CRKSV Jong Colombia – 3:1, 7:0 (Platense advance 10:1 on aggregate)
Final Round v.  Olimpia – 3:3
Final Round v.  Municipal – 0:0

Current squad
Updated on 23 June 2021.

Coaches

 Jaime Hormazábal
 Carlos "Zorro" Padilla (1965–67), (the coach when the team won its first championship)
 Haroldo Cordon (1981-1982)
 Roberto Scalessi (1977)
 Alberto Romero (1996)
 Ariel Sena (1996–97)
 Carlos "Zorro" Padilla (1998–99)
 Chelato Uclés (1999–01)
 Alberto Romero (2001–03), (the coach when the team won its second championship)
 Flavio Ortega (2005)
 Roque Alfaro (2006)
 Héctor Vargas (2006–07)
 Alberto Romero (2007)
 Roque Alfaro (2007–08)
 Nahúm Espinoza (2008–09)
 Rubén Guifarro (Feb 2009 – May 2009)
 Héctor Vargas (2009–11)
 Jairo Ríos (2011)
 Carlos de Toro (2011)
 Roque Alfaro (2011–12)
 Alberto Romero (2012)
 Hernán García (2012–13)
 Germando Adinolfi (2013–1?)
 Guillermo Bernárdez (2013–14)
 Carlos Martínez (2014–15)
 Carlos Ramón Tábora (February 2015–1?)
 Ricardo Ortiz (June 2015 – September 2015)
 Guillermo Bernárdez (September 2015–)
 Ariel Sena (January 2016 - June 2016)
 Reynaldo Clavasquín (June 2016 - October 2017)
 Jairo Ríos Rendón (October 2017 - December 2017)
 Carlos Martínez (January 2018 - April 2019)
 Carlos Orlando Caballero (April 2019 - May 2019)
 Anthony 'Chalate' Torres (May 2019 - September 2019)
 Héctor Castellón (September 2019 - December 2019)
 John Jairo López (January 2020 - April 2021)
 Nicolás Suazo (July 2021 - August 2021)
 Ramon Maradiaga (August 2021 - Present)

All time top goal scorers

1

References

External links
History of Platense

 
Platense
Association football clubs established in 1960
1960 establishments in Honduras
Puerto Cortés